Canadian Case Files was a 2005 Canadian television series about the investigation of unsolved crimes in Canada. It was hosted by Art Hindle.

External links
 

2000s Canadian documentary television series
Global Television Network original programming
PBS original programming